Liosteburia bleuzeni is a species of beetle in the family Cerambycidae, the only species in the genus Liosteburia.

References

Hesperophanini